Clonakilty was a constituency in County Cork represented in the Irish House of Commons until its abolition on 1 January 1801.

History
Established by a charter of King James I of England granting it to Sir Richard Boyle, it was purchased from Lord Burlington by Speaker Boyle in 1738 and he nominated the provost from three burgesses elected by the Corporation and freemen. In the Patriot Parliament of 1689 summoned by James II, Clonakilty was represented with two members. In the 1783 election 7 voted. It was disenfranchised by the Act of Union 1800 and Lord Shannon received compensation of £15,000. It was sometimes known as Cloghnakilty.

Members of Parliament, 1613–1801

Notes

References

Bibliography

Johnston-Liik, E. M. (2002). History of the Irish Parliament, 1692–1800, Publisher: Ulster Historical Foundation (28 Feb 2002),  
T. W. Moody, F. X. Martin, F. J. Byrne, A New History of Ireland 1534-1691, Oxford University Press, 1978
Tim Cadogan and Jeremiah Falvey, A Biographical Dictionary of Cork, 2006, Four Courts Press 

Clonakilty
Constituencies of the Parliament of Ireland (pre-1801)
Historic constituencies in County Cork
1613 establishments in Ireland
1800 disestablishments in Ireland
Constituencies established in 1613
Constituencies disestablished in 1800